The Câlnău is a right tributary of the river Dâmbovița in Romania. It discharges into the Dâmbovița in Vasilați.

References

Rivers of Romania
Rivers of Ilfov County
Rivers of Călărași County